Marlin Jon Appelwick (born July 2, 1953) was a judge of the Washington Court of Appeals, Division I, who served from 1998 until his retirement in 2022.

Biography 
Judge Appelwick first ran for election to the Washington Court of Appeals in 1998. He ran unopposed again in 2018 and retired from the court on March 31, 2022. Before becoming a judge, Judge Appelwick practiced law for 18 years in family law, business law, and mediation. Judge Appelwick was also a member of the Washington State Legislature for 16 years. He received both a BA and a BS in mathematics from the Minnesota State University, Mankato in 1976 and his JD from the University of Washington School of Law in 1979.

References 

Members of the Washington House of Representatives
Washington Court of Appeals judges
Living people
1953 births